Fool's Gold is a 1947 American Western film directed by George Archainbaud and written by Doris Schroeder. The film stars William Boyd, Andy Clyde, Rand Brooks, Robert Emmett Keane and Jane Randolph. The film was released on January 31, 1947, by United Artists. This is the 56th film of the 66 in the series and the first one produced by William Boyd Productions instead of Harry Sherman.

Plot
Hoppy infiltrates a band of outlaws to save his Army buddy's son who has fallen in with the wrong crowd.

Cast 
 William Boyd as Hopalong Cassidy
 Andy Clyde as California Carlson
 Rand Brooks as Lucky Jenkins
 Robert Emmett Keane as Professor Dixon
 Jane Randolph as Jessie Dixon
 Steve Barclay as Bruce Landy 
 Harry Cording as Henchman Duke
 Earle Hodgins as Sandler
 Robert Bentley as Henchman Barton 
 Wee Willie Davis as Blackie
 Forbes Murray as Colonel Jed Landy
 Glen B. Gallagher as Lieutenant Anderson
 Ben Corbett as Sergeant
 Fred Toones as Bar 20 Handy Man

Reception 
Variety wrote that it was "sturdy action fair for the outdoor fans" and that it was "good entertainment in its field."

References

External links 
 
 
 
 

1947 films
American black-and-white films
Films directed by George Archainbaud
United Artists films
American Western (genre) films
1947 Western (genre) films
Hopalong Cassidy films
1940s English-language films
1940s American films